MidMichigan Medical Center-Midland is a 324-bed, non-profit hospital in Midland, Michigan.  It is a member of MidMichigan Health, an integrated health delivery system affiliated with Michigan Medicine, the health care division of the University of Michigan. The medical center serves as a clinical site for medical students from Michigan State University - College of Human Medicine, Central Michigan University, and MidMichigan Community College nursing students.  A family medicine residency program is affiliated with Michigan State University.

History
MidMichigan Medical Center-Midland was designed by architect Alden B. Dow and constructed amid wartime restrictions in 1943–44. The first fifty years of the hospital's history is chronicled in the book, A Journey of Caring, by Dorthoy Langdon Yates.

Over the years, MidMichigan Medical Center-Midland became co-owned with other regional hospitals; as a result, the Medical Center in Midland became the flagship hospital of MidMichigan Health, which has been headquartered in Midland ever since.

Specialties
MidMichigan Medical Center-Midland is a secondary-level acute care hospital.

The medical center was verified as a level II trauma center in 2014 by the American College of Surgeons. 
The medical center is the site of one of the three Gamma Knives in the state of Michigan.
In August 2007, the medical center began performing open heart surgery.

Leadership
Ada Mitchell, R.N. served as the initial superintendent when the hospital opened in 1944. Upon her resignation the following year, Bernard Lorimer became superintendent, a title later changed to president. He was succeeded by David A. Reece in 1977. Richard M. Reynolds served in the role beginning in 2004. In May 2008, Gregory H. Rogers was named the hospital's fourth president.

Awards
In 2007, the hospital was named a Thomson 100 Top Hospital.

References

External links
Official website

Hospital buildings completed in 1944
Hospitals in Michigan
Midland, Michigan
Buildings and structures in Midland County, Michigan
Trauma centers